Lágrima is a fado album recorded by Amália Rodrigues and released in 1983 on the Columbia label (1652541). It was her final studio recording of new songs. 

The title track, "Lágrima", became an Amália standard. The song's lyrics were written by Rodrigues and set to music by Carlos Gonçalves.

Rodrigues was accompanied on the album by Carlos Gonçalves and José Fontes Rocha on guitar and Joel Pina and Jorge Fernando and Portuguese guitar. João Belchior Viegas was the producer.

Track listing
Side A
 Lágrima	
 Flor De Lua	
 Ai Minha Doce Loucura	
 Ai Maria	
 O Fado Chora-se Bem	
 Olha A Ribeirinha

Side B
 Morrinha	
 Ai As Gentes Ai A Vida	
 Amor De Mel Amor De Fel	
 Sou Filha Das Ervas	
 Asa Do Vento	
 Grito

References

1983 albums
Amália Rodrigues albums